The following are the national records in track cycling in Portugal maintained by the Federação Portuguesa de Ciclismo.

Men

Women

References

External links
 Official website

Portuguese
Records
Track cycling
track cycling